Ondřej Trojan (born 31 December 1959) is a Czech film producer, actor and film director. Two of the films he produced were nominated for the Academy Award for Best Foreign Language Film : Divided We Fall (2000) and Želary (2003), which he also directed. He is the brother of Ivan Trojan.

Filmography

External links

Czech film producers
German-language film directors
1959 births
Living people
Film directors from Prague